Pokachi is a town in Khanty–Mansi Autonomous Okrug, Russia, located on the right bank of the Vatyegan River,  east of Khanty-Mansiysk and  northeast of Tyumen. Population:

History
It was founded in 1984 due to the development of oil fields in its vicinity. It was granted town status in 1992. The name "Pokachi" is derived from the name of a Khanty family that once owned these lands.

Administrative and municipal status
Within the framework of administrative divisions, it is incorporated as the town of okrug significance of Pokachi—an administrative unit with the status equal to that of the districts. As a municipal division, the town of okrug significance of Pokachi is incorporated as Pokachi Urban Okrug.

Economy
The town's economy is based on oil extraction.

References

Notes

Sources

Cities and towns in Khanty-Mansi Autonomous Okrug
Socialist planned cities